Iglesia de San Salvador may refer to:

 Iglesia de San Salvador (Cifuentes)
 Iglesia de San Salvador (Fuentes)
 Iglesia de San Salvador (Guetaria)
 Iglesia de San Salvador (Nocedo)
 Iglesia de San Salvador (Priesca)